Unschuldig is a German television series.

See also
List of German television series

External links
 

2008 German television series debuts
2008 German television series endings
German crime television series
German-language television shows
ProSieben original programming
German legal television series